Richard Fred Drott (July 1, 1936 – August 16, 1985) was a Major League Baseball player who pitched for the Chicago Cubs and the Houston Colt .45s.  Drott, nicknamed "Hummer", started his major league career in 1957 with the Cubs. He won 15 games as a rookie, led the league in walks allowed, and finished third in balloting for Rookie of the Year. He graduated from Western Hills High School in Cincinnati, Ohio.

On April 24, 1957, Drott was ejected from a game for using a wheelchair to wheel Moe Drabowsky to first base after Drabowsky claimed he was hit on the foot by a pitch.

Arm injuries limited Drott's effectiveness after 1957.  He was drafted during the regular phase of the 1961 MLB Expansion Draft by the Houston Colt .45s. After posting a 2–12 record in 1963, Drott was sent back to the minor leagues. By 1965 he was finished playing professional baseball. Drott finished his career with a record of 27–46 with a lifetime 4.78 ERA in 176 games played.

Dick Drott died of stomach cancer at age 49.

References

External links

1936 births
1985 deaths
Baseball players from Cincinnati
Burlington Bees players
Deaths from cancer in Illinois
Cedar Rapids Indians players
Chicago Cubs players
Columbus Jets players
Deaths from stomach cancer
Des Moines Bruins players
Fort Worth Cats players
Houston Colt .45s players
Los Angeles Angels (minor league) players
Major League Baseball pitchers
Oklahoma City 89ers players
San Antonio Bullets players